Back is a British sitcom starring David Mitchell and Robert Webb. It was filmed and is set in and around Stroud, Gloucestershire. The Channel 4 series was created by Simon Blackwell, and its first series was broadcast from 6 September – 11 October 2017.

A second series of six episodes was announced in November 2017; filming was scheduled to begin in October 2019. On 19 September 2020, Webb announced that the second series' shooting had concluded. Series two began airing on 21 January 2021. The series premiered on Sundance Now in December 2017 before premiering on Sundance TV in the US in September 2018. The second season premiered on 31 March 2021 on sister network IFC in the US a week later after it premiered in full on Sundance Now on March 24.

Plot
After the death of his father, Laurie, 42-year-old Stephen is set to take over the family business, the John Barleycorn pub, in Stroud, Gloucestershire. His plans are interrupted when Andrew, a former foster child briefly raised by Stephen's parents, returns to his life eager to renew his relationship with the family. While Andrew quickly charms the rest of Stephen's family – including his mother Ellen, sister Cass, and uncle Geoff – Stephen resents Andrew and views him as "a glib, dangerous sociopath who's about to steal his family, his business and his life". Andrew fondly remembers the time he spent living with the family as happy, whereas Stephen remembers the same time as miserable.

Cast

Episodes

Series 1 (2017)

Series 2 (2021)

Reception

The series received good reviews.

References

External links
 Back at Channel 4
 
 
 

2017 British television series debuts
2010s British sitcoms
2010s British workplace comedy television series
2020s British sitcoms
2020s British workplace comedy television series
Channel 4 sitcoms
English-language television shows
Stroud
Suicide in television
Television series about dysfunctional families
Television series about siblings
Television series by Big Talk Productions
Television shows set in Gloucestershire